Pesé   is a town and corregimiento in Pesé District, Herrera Province, Panama with a population of 2,565 as of 2010. It is the seat of Pesé District. Its population as of 1990 was 2,362; its population as of 2000 was 2,547.

References

Corregimientos of Herrera Province
Populated places in Herrera Province